Piermaria Siciliano (born 27 June 1974, in Catania) is a retired freestyle swimmer from Italy, who represented his native country at two consecutive Summer Olympics: 1992 and 1996. He won the bronze medal in the men's 4×200 m freestyle at the 1995 European Aquatics Championships, alongside Massimiliano Rosolino, Emanuele Merisi, and Emanuele Idini.

References 
 RAI Profile

1974 births
Living people
Italian male swimmers
Swimmers at the 1992 Summer Olympics
Swimmers at the 1996 Summer Olympics
Olympic swimmers of Italy
Sportspeople from Catania
European Aquatics Championships medalists in swimming
Italian male freestyle swimmers